This is a list of known mass shootings that have occurred in Germany. Casualty figures only include those killed or injured with firearms.

2020s

2010s

2000s

1990s

1980s

1970s

1940s

1910s

Notes

References

Germany
Mass shootings